Luoyang Museum is a historical museum in Luoyang, Henan Province, China. Situated in the Yellow River valley. It offers exhibits of the rich cultural heritage of  Luoyang, a major Chinese cultural centre, which was the capital of numerous Chinese dynasties including the Eastern Zhou and the Eastern Han.

The new museum opened on May 1, 1974. It houses relics from excavation sites on the outskirts of Luoyang, in the city's old section. They include antiquaries from palaces and temples. These artifacts establish the historical past of Luoyang,  representing elements of the ancient city of nine capitals, from Neolithic times up to 937 AD.

Architecture and fittings
The museum is built in ancient Tang Dynasty, Chinese architectural style.  An Eastern Han Dynasty painting of the "hundred-flower" lantern is displayed on the front facade of the museum.

The antiquaries are arranged to demonstrate the evolution of social structure, beginning with primitive society in the first hall, followed by exhibits related to slavery, and feudalism. The exhibits are also arranged in a sequence of ancient cultures starting with Heluo, followed by Yangshao, Longshan, Xia (21st century BC-17th century  BC), Shang (17th century BC-11th century BC) and ending with Zhou (11th century BC-256 BC).

Exhibits
Two collections are major permanent exhibits: the Historical and Cultural Relics of Luoyang and the Selected Cultural Relics of Luoyang. Travelling collections from the Luoyang Museum are located in Japan, Germany, France, Singapore and South Korea. In addition, the museum also conducts exhibitions of carved stone, Pottery figurines of Han and Tang Dynasties, cultural relic of ancient Chinese Palace, calligraphy and paintings, and other items every year.

Many of the exhibits are of bronze, pottery, porcelain, gold, silver, jade and stone wares. In addition, the Ming and Qing dynasty articles include ancient calligraphic works and paintings, and folk art objects. Pieces include: Stone Age figurines and implements of Tang Dynasty; a figurine of a young woman with coiled hair excavated in 1980; a young woman figurine in clay with dragon design headgear; an imperial attendant at the Jingling Mausoleum of Ziyou, Emperor Xianzhuang Mangssssssan of Northern Wei Dynasty; and an imperial attendant at the Jingling Mausoleum of Yuan Key, Emperor Xuanwu of Northern Wei Dynasty.

These include jade, bronzes, and pottery artifacts of the Xia and Shang dynasty. Three relics from the earliest Buddhist Yongning Temple built in 519 under the Northern Wei dynasty reign, and a figure painted in clay unearthed from the base of the Yongning Temple are also part of the collection.

Of the mingqi items excavated in 1972 from a nearby Western Han tomb, a house-like kitchen and 190 pottery articles are a part of the museum collection. There are two epitaph tablets that record the construction of the Gongling mausoleum of Li Hong.

Research and training
The museum also functions as a centre for research and training.

References

Museums in Luoyang
Local museums in China
Archaeological museums in China
Museums established in 1958
1958 establishments in China
National first-grade museums of China